Russia competed at the 2002 Winter Paralympics in Salt Lake City, United States. 26 competitors from Russia won 21 medals including 7 gold, 9 silver and 5 bronze and finished 5th in the medal table.

See also 
 Russia at the Paralympics
 Russia at the 2002 Winter Olympics

References 

2002
2002 in Russian sport
Nations at the 2002 Winter Paralympics